Kole  is both a given name and a surname. Notable people with the name include:

Given name

Kole Ayi (born 1978), American football player
Kole Calhoun (born 1987), American baseball player
Kole Čašule (1921–2009), Macedonian writer
Kole Heckendorf (born 1985), American football player
Kole Nedelkovski (1912–1941), Macedonian revolutionary
Kole Omotosho (born 1943), Nigerian writer
Kole Rašić (1839–1898), Serb revolutionary

Surname
 Amber Kole (born 1986), American pair skater
 André Kole (born 1936), American magician
 Emmanuel Mate Kole (1860–1939), Ghanaian politician
 Eugene Kole, American official
 Hilary Kole, American jazz singer
 Nicholas Kole (born 1983), American pair skater
 Warren Kole (born 1977), American actor

See also
Kolë
Cole (name)
Kohl (surname)